Flat Creek is a stream in Benton, Morgan and
Pettis counties in the U.S. state of Missouri. It is a tributary of the Lamine River.

Flat Creek most likely derives its name from a corruption of the French word plat, meaning "shallow".

See also
List of rivers of Missouri

References

Rivers of Benton County, Missouri
Rivers of Morgan County, Missouri
Rivers of Pettis County, Missouri
Rivers of Missouri